was a Japanese professional sumo wrestler from the Minamitsugaru District (now Fujisaki) in the Aomori Prefecture.

History
Born on April 1, 1892, in Aomori Prefecture. He decided to join professional sumo in 1910 after a touring team came to Fujisaki in the summer.
 Even though he had a small stature, his enthusiasm earned him admission in the Dewanoumi stable, and he stepped in the ring for the first time in 1912. Although he was a small fighter, he rose through the ranks through hard work and diligence. However, as might be expected, he was unable to achieve good results at the higher ranks at first due to the weaknesses of his small stature. Ōnosato was however promoted komusubi and sekiwake in the 1922 tournaments. He earned a promotion to the rank of ōzeki in the May 1925 tournament. He held the rank for 7 straight years. Ōnosato earned the nickname 'Sumo god' because of his warm personality and his enthusiastic guidance of young wrestlers, and he became popular with many rikishi.

The Shunjuen Incident

Ōnosato became one of the leader of the  that broke out on January 6, 1932. One day after the January banzuke release, 32 Dewanoumi ichimon (clan) wrestlers gathered at a Chinese restaurant named Shunjuen, located in Tokyo's Oimachi district. They demanded full scale reforms from the Japan Sumo Association to improve the wrestlers living conditions. Subsequently, a number of sekitori from a non-Dewanoumi ichimon, including then sekiwake Minanogawa, joined the protest . The Association was faced with an unprecedented crisis never before seen in the history of professional sumo and responded quickly to the group's demands, but their responses were considered to be half-hearted and lacking in substance, and eventually, the negotiations collapsed.
Just like his comrade Tenryū Saburō, Ōnosato cut off his ōichōmage top knot
 and founded with the secessionists the Kansai Sumo Association (Kansai Kakuryoku Kyokai, 関西角力協会) where he wrestled until 1935. He then served as chairman of this association but his declining health precipitated the fall of the organization and the wrestlers came back to Tokyo.

Fighting style
Ōnosato was known for his short stature and had to compensate for this weak point with his technique. He was particularly known for his tachi-ai and use of the roundness of the ring.

Death and homage
Ōnosato, among the wrestlers of the Kansai Sumo Association, took part in a tournament in Manchuria in 1933. The tournament was to be held to put his association back on track after several successive failures and the desertion of several wrestlers who returned to the Sumo Association in Tokyo. He fell ill and was admitted to a Red Cross hospital in Dalian. He died of pleurisy in January 1938, at the age of 45, after a long illness. The day after the news of Onosato's death, the Dewanoumi ichimon received a final letter from Ōnosato in which he expressed his concern and encouragement for his Kansai disciples who had returned to the stable. 
 
On August 1, 1960, a monument was unveiled in the precincts of Kashima Shrine in his hometown of Fujisaki and a competition for elementary school students of the Aomori Prefecture, called the "Ōnosato Cup Youth Sumo Tournament", is held every year in August in that shrine. 
On February 4, 2023, several of his belongings were donated to his hometown of Fujisaki. The objects were in possession of the family of Ōnosato's former patron. Among the  dozen of valuable materials, photographs, his akeni (明荷, sumo luggage) and a keshō-mawashi were donated.

Top Division Record

See also
Glossary of sumo terms
List of past sumo wrestlers
List of ōzeki

References 

1892 births
Japanese sumo wrestlers
Sumo people from Aomori Prefecture
Ōzeki
1938 deaths